Bhoomi is a 2021 Indian Tamil-language action drama film, written and directed by Lakshman. This film is produced by Jayam Ravi's mother-in-law Sujatha Vijayakumar under the production banner Home Movie Makers. The film stars Jayam Ravi and Nidhhi Agerwal, with Ronit Roy and Sathish in supporting roles. The film is set on the backdrop based on agriculture. The soundtrack and background score was composed by D. Imman. This marks the 25th film for Ravi. The film began streaming on Disney+ Hotstar on 14 January 2021 coinciding with Pongal. The film received extremely negative reviews from critics and audiences alike, with criticism for its performances, predictability, script, screenplay and romantic scenes.

Plot 

Bhoominathan is a NASA scientist who discovers that plant life can exist on Mars by adjusting certain anaerobic conditions needed for survival. He is highly praised by his peers for his discovery. While on a one-month vacation in Tamil Nadu, he discovers that his village is affected by drought and the underwater reservoir of his land has been drained away for futile purposes by certain corporations. He's also dismayed to find out that his uncle, who is an agriculturalists, is burdened with farm debts due to the scarcity of water supply in his village. His uncle had tried to sort out this issue rigorously with the local MLA, the district collector and the governing body but in vain, and eventually, he succumbs to the pressure by burning himself. 

Unable to withstand the grief over the death of his uncle, Bhoominathan vows to avenge Richard Child, the chief of the leading corporate (who is the main villain in this story), by summoning him to the court of law. Still, his attempts go unrecognised before the villain's money and might. However, Bhoominathan decides to fight it out in an intelligent way by gaining the trust of his village people and by starting his own trusted corporate 'Thamizhan' by the village people and the corporate company's former employees, despite facing many obstacles. Finally, he succeeds in his attempts and reclaims and replenishes his land using the knowledge of his hybrid plant technology that he had learnt in the past and saves his land and his people from drought.

Cast

Production 
The film project marks the third collaboration between Jayam Ravi and director Lakshman after Romeo Juliet (2015) and Bogan (2017). The film also marks the Kollywood debut for Ronit Roy.

Soundtrack 

The music is composed by D. Imman, and released on Sony Music India label.

Release 
The film received negative reviews from critics and audiences alike. The film was supposed to have its theatrical release on 1 May 2020 but was indefinitely postponed due to the COVID-19 pandemic in India. It was later revealed that the theatrical release of the film was called off due to the COVID-19 pandemic and was set to have its direct release in OTT platform. The filmmakers later confirmed that the film would be released via Disney+ Hotstar as a Pongal release on 14 January 2021.

Baradwaj Rangan of Film Companion South wrote "There’s a great idea, with echoes of the Swadeshi movement, that says farmers should be self-dependent. But if intentions were enough, every movie would be a masterpiece."

References

External links 
 

2021 action drama films
2021 films
Films about agriculture
Films about farmers' suicides in India
Films about social issues in India
Films scored by D. Imman
Disney+ Hotstar original films
Indian action drama films
2020s masala films
2020s Tamil-language films
2021 direct-to-video films
Indian direct-to-video films